The Colombo Port Power Station (also sometimes referred to as the Colombo Port Power Barge) is a , permanently moored at the Colombo Harbour, in the Western Province of Sri Lanka. After the plant's 15-year license expired in 2015, the Ceylon Electricity Board purchased the powership in a controversial deal. It was previously owned by Colombo Power Private Limited, a 50-50 joint venture by Mitsui Engineering & Shipbuilding and Kawasho Corporation.

The barge was built by Sasebo Heavy Industries, with funding from the Japan Bank for International Cooperation.

See also 
 List of power stations in Sri Lanka

References

External links 
 
 Mitsui Engineering and Shipbuilding
 MAN engines

Oil-fired power stations in Sri Lanka
Powerships
Buildings and structures in Colombo